Dypterygia punctirena is a moth of the family Noctuidae. It is found on Hispaniola, Jamaica and Puerto Rico and has also been reported from Florida.

The wingspan is about 35 mm.

References

Moths described in 1857
Hadeninae